Gail Mancuso (born July 14, 1958) is an American film and television director.

Early life and career
Mancuso grew up in Melrose Park, Illinois. She is married to Brian Downs, a doctor, and divides her time between her homes in Valencia, California and River Forest, Illinois.

Mancuso began her career as an usher of the set of several television talk shows. Later, became a script supervisor for the Showtime comedy Brothers. In 1989, she began serving as associate director for Roseanne. After one of the show's directors left in 1991, she had the chance to become one of the main directors and continued until the show's eighth season. She went on to direct episodes of many television series like Friends, Dharma and Greg and Two Guys, a Girl, and a Pizza Place.

In 2007, Mancuso began working on the CBS sitcom Rules of Engagement. She has also directed episodes of 30 Rock and Scrubs. In 2008, she won a Gracie Award for her work on 30 Rock.

In 2011, she was nominated for a Primetime Emmy Award for her Modern Family episode "Slow Down Your Neighbors". In 2012, she directed Roseanne Barr and John Goodman in the pilot episode of Downwardly Mobile which was commissioned by NBC, but ultimately not picked up. In 2013, she won the Emmy Award for directing episode "Arrested" on Modern Family. In 2014, she won the Emmy Award for directing episode "Las Vegas" on Modern Family.

In 2019, Mancuso made her feature film directorial debut with A Dog's Journey which was the sequel to 2017's A Dog's Purpose directed by Lasse Hallström.

Filmography

References

External links 

American television directors
American women television directors
Living people
1958 births
People from Melrose Park, Illinois
Primetime Emmy Award winners
Television producers from California
American women television producers
People from Valencia, Santa Clarita, California
People from River Forest, Illinois
Television producers from Illinois
21st-century American women